Lutetium phthalocyanine is a coordination compound derived from lutetium and two phthalocyanines. It was the first known example of a molecule that is an intrinsic semiconductor. It exhibits electrochromism, changing color when subject to a voltage.

Structure
 is a double-decker sandwich compound consisting of a  ion coordinated to two the conjugate base of two phthalocyanines.  The rings are arranged in a staggered conformation. The extremities of the two ligands are slightly distorted outwards. The complex features a non-innocent ligand, in the sense that the macrocycles carry an extra electron. It is a free radical with the unpaired electron sitting in a half-filled molecular orbital between the highest occupied and lowest unoccupied orbitals, allowing its electronic properties to be finely tuned.

Properties
, along with many substituted derivatives like the alkoxy-methyl derivative , can be deposited as a thin film with intrinsic semiconductor properties; said properties arise due to its radical nature and its low reduction potential compared to other metal phthalocyanines. This initially green film exhibits electrochromism; the oxidized form  is red, whereas the reduced form  is blue and the next two reduced forms are dark blue and violet, respectively. The green/red oxidation cycle can be repeated over 10,000 times in aqueous solution with dissolved alkali metal halides, before it is degraded by hydroxide ions; the green/blue redox degrades faster in water.

Electrical properties
 and other lanthanide phthalocyanines are of interest in the development of organic thin-film field-effect transistors.

 derivatives can be selected to change color in the presence of certain molecules, such as in gas detectors; for example, the thioether derivative  changes from green to brownish-purple in the presence of NADH.

References

Phthalocyanines
Lutetium complexes
Chemical tests
Organic semiconductors
Sandwich compounds
Free radicals